Rinyo was a Neolithic settlement on Rousay in Orkney, Scotland.

The site was excavated in 1938 and 1946 by Vere Gordon Childe, who also excavated Skara Brae on Mainland Orkney, and by W. G. Grant. Finds included flint implements, stone axes and balls, pottery and a stone mace-head.

Over 100 archaeological sites have been identified on Rousay, including the complex of Midhowe Broch and Midhowe Chambered Cairn.

References

3rd-millennium BC architecture in Scotland
1837 archaeological discoveries
1838 archaeological discoveries
Archaeological sites in Orkney
Prehistoric Orkney
Stone Age sites in Scotland
Former populated places in Scotland
Scheduled monuments in Scotland
Neolithic Scotland
1837 in Scotland
1838 in Scotland
Neolithic settlements
Rousay